The Evansville, Owensboro and Nashville Railroad was a 19th-century railway company in western Kentucky in the United States. It operated from 1873, when it purchased the Owensboro & Russellville, until 1877, when it was purchased by the Owensboro & Nashville. Its former rights-of-way currently form parts of the class-I CSX Transportation railway.

It connected with the Elizabethtown and Paducah Railroad and its successors  the Louisville, Paducah and Southwestern Railroad and the Paducah and Elizabethtown Railroad  at Central City in Muhlenberg County.

See also
 List of Kentucky railroads

Defunct Kentucky railroads
Defunct companies based in Kentucky